The University of Siegen is a public research university located in Siegen, North Rhine-Westphalia and is part of the Deutsche Forschungsgemeinschaft, a society of Germany's leading research universities. The University was founded in 1972. 18,618 students were enrolled at the university as of the year 2017.

History
Siegen's heritage as a centre for education and research dates back to the 16th century. In 1536, William I, Count of Nassau-Siegen charged Saxon educator and theologian Erasmus Sarcerius with the task of establishing a Latin school. During the period 1594 to 1599/1600 and 1606 to 1609, the Calvinist-Reformed Herborn Academy (Academia Nassauensis) moved from Herborn to Siegen, where it was accommodated in the buildings of the lower castle.

"Wiesenbauschule"
In 1853, Wiesenbauschule landscaping school was established, which soon gained a reputation outside of its local area. Here, landscaping and land improvements including irrigation techniques and the drainage of meadows were taught, so as to help enhance the yields from farmland. This was of particular importance in the Siegerland region because the high demand for charcoal for the regional ironworks meant that most areas were woodland. As a result, limited areas were suitable for cattle breeding, so that research into enhancing the yields from the limited amount of meadowland had to be researched.

Following World War Two, the school's focus shifted towards civil engineering, and, in 1962, it was renamed Staatliche Ingenieurschule für Bauwesen (State School of Civil Engineering).

Precursor and foundation
The next academic facility to be set up in Siegen (formerly located at Weidenau/Hüttental) was the Pädagogische Hochschule Siegerland (Educational University Siegerland), established in 1964. In 1965, it became the Siegerland section of Pädagogische Hochschule Westfalen-Lippe (Educational University Westfalen-Lippe), which marked its transformation into a scientific university.

On 1 August 1972, the comprehensive university development act led to the setting up of a comprehensive university at Siegen/Hüttental, along with four other comprehensive universities in North Rhine-Westphalia. The Pädagogische Hochschule Siegerland and Siegen-Gummersbach University of Applied Sciences which had schools based at Siegen and Gummersbach merged to form the new Siegen comprehensive university. In 1980, Siegen comprehensive university was renamed Universität-Gesamthochschule (University-Comprehensive University). The Gummersbach location was transferred, on 1 June 1983, to Cologne University of Applied Sciences. Then, on 1 January 2003, the form of "comprehensive university" was abandoned, and the existing comprehensive universities became regular universities. Since then, the university has been called University of Siegen.

Current orientation

In 1996, the University/Comprehensive University of Siegen was the first German university to take part in the "Institutional Quality Audit Programme" of the Conference of European Rectors (CRE) and went on to implement the auditors' recommendations step-by-step. University of Siegen sees itself as a modern university with a focus on basic research, practical training and contributing towards structural change in the district of Siegen-Wittgenstein and adjacent regions.

In line with the political objectives which led to the establishment of comprehensive universities, the University of Siegen is a hallmark for democracy, equal opportunities, transparent professional and scientific education as well as an international outlook. The reform approach inherent to the comprehensive university was put into practice through integral programmes, such as the innovative integrated diploma programmes "Media planning, development and consultancy" and "German and European commercial law".

Within the framework of the Bologna process, the University of Siegen implemented the Bachelor/Masters system early on, with the aim of completing the set-up of this model in all faculties during winter semester 2006–2007. The last remaining diploma programmes were actually transformed into Bachelor/Masters programmes during winter semester 2008–2009. This move enables students' achievements to be comparable and drives the international orientation of programmes. In addition, modern language training with a focus on partnerships abroad is being introduced and enhanced.

The University of Siegen is increasingly committed to working with alumni and organizes alumni meetings at regular intervals.

Organization

Faculties

University of Siegen offers in total 126 degree programmes across four faculties:

Scientific Centres and Institutions

Transdisciplinary media research
Institute for media research
Graduate School "Locating Media"

Liberal arts, social science and educational studies
University of Siegen Competence Centre
Research institute for liberal arts and social sciences
Institute for European Regional Research
Siegen Institute for professional language and communication
Siegen centre for socialization, CV and biography research
Centre for annotational interpretation of Kant
Centre for teacher training
Centre for planning and evaluation of social services
Siegen centre for gender studies

Business economics with a focus on "decentral organization"
South Westphalia academy for medium-sized business
Siegen medium-sized business institute
Siegen institute for company taxation, auditing, reporting and commercial law
Centre for economic training in Siegen
Centre of excellence

Natural sciences and engineering
Centre for innovative materials
Centre for developing country research and knowledge transfer
DFG Research Unit "Quark Flavour Physics and Effective Field Theories"
DFG post graduate programme "Imaging New Modalities"
North Rhine-Westphalia centre for sensor systems
Research centre for micro/nano chemistry and technology
Research centre for multidisciplinary analyses and applied system optimization
Research Institute for Water and Environment
Siegen Center for Particle Physics (CPPS)

Interdisciplinary centre of competence for existing buildings

Students

General
The university has a combined undergraduate and graduate student population of around 17,500. Approximately 13.5% of these students are foreigners.
The University of Siegen offers a large variety of undergraduate, graduate, and postdoctoral degree programs at its four faculties in 144 fields of study.
As common among German universities, the academic year consists of summer and winter terms (semesters). The winter term runs from 1 October to 31 March, while the summer term runs from 1 April to 30 September. However, lectures and classes usually do not run for the full duration of these periods and allow for breaks in spring and fall.
German universities enjoy government subsidies, and as a result of legislative reform, beginning in Fall 2011 the University of Siegen will no longer charge tuition fees.

Student life
There are numerous student clubs and organizations, among them a student-run radio station, Radius 92.1, and a student television program, Campus TV.
Siegen is situated in one of the most densely forested areas in Germany and offers fine opportunities for leisure and outdoor activities.
The university provides student housing in its various dormitories, run by the Studentenwerk. Additionally, there are further dormitories in Siegen which are operated by other institutions as well as partnerships with elderly people. Many students find private living arrangements, such as Wohngemeinschaften (shared apartments).

International Students
The International Office is the main contact for questions concerning the international course of studies, the international academy cooperation and the international academic exchange. Additionally the International Office guides and mentors international applicants for a place at university with all kinds of questions around the course of studies and life in Siegen.
A number of activities for international students facilitates their integration and help students to find new friends. Each semester the International Office offers a Welcome week where international students are guided through their first steps in Siegen (walk through the city, opening a bank account, registration for medical insurance etc.). During the semester a program including trips to nearby cities, intercultural trainings or high rope courses is offered.

Campus

The University of Siegen is a campus university with some 92,000 m² of floor space. Buildings are distributed across three core areas in Siegen (Haardter Berg hill, Emmy-Noether-Campus and administration based at Herrengarten).

Location
Most university buildings are on the north-eastern side of Siegen, in the Weidenau district. Facilities at Haardter Berg include the Adolf-Reichwein-Straße campus, which has the largest lecture halls, the central canteen, the central library as well as a part of the centre for information and media technology. Some 500 m south-east is the Hölderlinstraße campus, which accommodates the centre for information and media technology, the central course guidance service and a departmental library. Another 400 m south, at Paul-Bonatz-Straße, is the engineering Campus, the modern-day descendant of the former engineering school. Artur-Woll-Haus on the eastern slope of Haardter Berg hill, which opened on 25 March 2003, accommodates the guest house and the externally funded research facilities.

 west of Haardter Berg, on the borders of the Weidenau and Geisweid districts, is the former brewery, where the art faculty is located. Here, art students create practical work, including painting and photography, and exhibitions are held on a regular basis.
The university administration and student services are located in the former Siegen inland revenue offices at Herrengarten, right in the city centre, whilst the international office can be found in Siegen's former telegraph office. The city, the university and the government are working together to put Siegen's lower castle completely at the university's disposal to accommodate facilities and faculties.

Architecture
Artur-Woll-Haus is an exceptional building, which was designed by Dutch architects rau architecten. It consists of an arc-shaped central unit with three wings that resemble a tug. The cost of construction was around €8.6 million.

The University of Siegen was planned together with other universities in North Rhine-Westphalia, so that a similar style and even some of the same building modules can be found at universities of Duisburg-Essen, Paderborn und Wuppertal.

Notable Alumni and Professors
 Marcel Beyer (born 1965), writer
 Uwe Boll (born 1965), director, producer and screenwriter
 Paul Breuer (born 1950), parliamentary defense policy spokesman for the Christian Democratic Union
 Peter Hussing (born 1948), heavyweight boxing champion
 Thomas Kellner (born 1966), Fine Art Photographer, Guest Professor and Curator
 Andreas Pinkwart (born 1960), deputy prime minister of North Rhine-Westphalia 2005–2009 (Free Democratic Party)
 Hans Ulrich Gumbrecht (born 1948), German-American professor of literary studies 
 Frank Sauer (born 1959), Kabarett artist, actor and writer
 Frank Schirrmacher (born 1959), co-publisher of the national German newspaper Frankfurter Allgemeine Zeitung
 Klaus-Peter Thaler (born 1949), cyclo-cross champion
 Axel Weber (born 1957), Chairman of UBS and former president of Deutsche Bundesbank

References

External links

  

 
University
Educational institutions established in 1972
1972 establishments in Germany
Universities and colleges in North Rhine-Westphalia